Chureppu Dam  is an earthfill dam located in Hokkaido Prefecture in Japan. The dam is used for irrigation. The catchment area of the dam is 22.5 km2. The dam impounds about 54  ha of land when full and can store 2405 thousand cubic meters of water. The construction of the dam was started on 1926 and completed in 1930.

References

Dams in Hokkaido